Pancán District is one of thirty-four districts of the province Jauja in Peru.

Archaeological Sites 

On the side of a hill in the south-west corder of the district lies the small site Pueblo Viejo. Initially occupied at the beginning of the Late Intermediate Period during the rule of the Huarpas. Now somewhat overgrown and unmaintained, walls of some buildings remain.

Geology 

To the south west of the district is an area of dramatic valley erosion, the Cañoncitos de Pichiluli.

References